Mia Lövheim (born 1968) is a professor of the Sociology of Religion at Uppsala University in Uppsala, Sweden with a research specialisation in new media. 

After completing her doctorate in 2004 with a dissertation published as Intersecting Identities: Young People, Religion, and Interaction on the Internet, she did postdoctoral work at the Institute for Media and Communication at the University of Oslo, in Norway, pursuing the theme of her dissertation on youth self-definition on the internet, particularly in relation to girls and to religion, with a project entitled Between Postmodernity and Tradition: Young Women's Values in Mediated Stories on the Internet, and was appointed to a professorship in 2011. Based on her research, she has spoken to the challenges the established churches face in attracting new members among youth.

Publications
Intersecting Identities: Young People, Religion, and Interaction on the Internet, Uppsala University, 2004, 
 (ed.) Media, Religion, and Gender: Key Issues and New Challenges, Routledge, 2013,

References

External links
Mia Lövheim at Network for New Media, Religion and Digital Culture Studies
List of publications at Nordicom

1968 births
Living people
Swedish sociologists
Swedish women sociologists
Academic staff of Uppsala University
Place of birth missing (living people)
Swedish women academics